Khel Khel Mein Foundation (KKMF or KKM Foundation) is a non-profit organisation, currently operating in the "Sports for development" space and aims to bring competitive sport to children studying at low-income city schools, rural schools and communities in India. Headquartered in Delhi, the Foundation was started by a group of Teach For India fellows in 2013. Through its activities, the Foundation aims to empower children by using sports to build teamwork, leadership, and unity in their schools and communities, and inculcate healthy habits across the board.

Motto

"PLAY. PERFORM. PROSPER" is the Foundation's motto.

Presence
Currently, Khel Khel Mein Foundation's sports intervention has a presence across the Teach For India network of schools in Delhi, rural schools and underserved communities.

Activities
In 2014, the Foundation's efforts culminated in a unique sports league, which saw the participation of over 2055 students over 64 days in Kho Kho, Football and Track & Field events, at multiple events in Delhi.

The Foundation is currently training over 6000 students in schools in Delhi, and prepping them for the league of 2015. This year's sports league will also feature Surr a popular sport played in Ayodhya.

External links

 Official Website
 Goal.com Paris Saint Germain Foundation join hands with Teach For India fellows in 'Khel Khel Mein' initiative
 Times of India Dribbling their way out of darkness
 MSR Sports Teach for India & Paris Saint Germain Foundation's unique initiative - Khel Khel Mein League fosters football for hope
 The Hindu Football competition concludes
 Goal.com 'Khel Khel Mein' football league ends on a high

Sports organisations of India
Non-profit organisations based in India